David M. Patrick (born 1947 in Devonshire) is an English organist. He was educated at Exeter School and then pursued his musical education at the Royal College of Music in London with distinction winning the Stuart Prize for organ in 1967 and going on to gain the Walford Davies Prize the following year. This award brought him recitals at both Westminster Cathedral and Westminster Abbey as well as being presented to Queen Elizabeth the Queen Mother.

His early decision to specialise in the romantic and modern French repertoire followed logically from his impulse to accept the highest technical and artistic challenges which the organ presents. Of particular note was his recording of the complete works of Maurice Durufle made at Coventry Cathedral in 1996.  This was a Critic's Choice of the Year in the B.B.C. Music Magazine in 1997 and in the final list of three highly recommended recordings in the B.B.C. programme "Building a Library" in May 2006.

David M. Patrick has performed public concerts at venues in Great Britain, the United States, Canada and Europe as well as recitals for the BBC on significant British instruments. Patrick lived and worked in Norway from 1996 until December 2012 when he returned to Devon. Many of his recordings are available from Amazon, iTunes and Spotify.

Recordings
BBC
Maurice Duruflé, Suite Op.5; Louis Vierne, 5 Pieces de Fantaisie; (1976) Buckfast Abbey, Cathedral Recordings CRMS 867
 Louis Vierne, Symphonie No.6; (1978) Buckfast Abbey, Cathedral Recordings CRMS 866
 Louis Vierne, Symphonie No.2; (1978) Buckfast Abbey, Saga Records SAGA 5487
 "Parisian Splendour"; (1987) Buckfast Abbey, Priory Records PRCD 213
 Seven Famous British Organs; (1988) various, Buckfast Abbey, Priory Records PRCD 902
 Great European Organs No.28; (1991) Blackburn Cathedral, Priory Records PRCD 371 
 The Great European Organs Series; (1993) various, Blackburn Cathedral, Priory Records PRCD 906
 Complete organ works of Maurice Duruflé; Louis Vierne, Trois Improvisations; (1996) Coventry Cathedral, ASV CD DCA 993
 Charles-Marie Widor, Symphonie 6 and Symphonie 3, Trois Nouvelles Pieces; (2000) Coventry Cathedral ASV CD DCA 1106 
 Suite Gothique, Boëllmann, Guilmant, Gigout and Franck (2001); Katarina Church, Stockholm, Zerga Records ZXS 1
 Fanfare 2; (2003) various, Buckfast Abbey, Priory Records PRCD 5001
 "French Organ Masterworks"; (2004-5), Gloucester Cathedral, Sanctuary Records Group CD RSN 3073
David M. Patrick plays the organ of Coventry Cathedral (2015) various, Coventry Cathedral, Guild Music GMCD 7801
Alexandre Guilmant, Sonata No.4, Sonata No.7, Louis Vierne, 4 Pièces de Fantaisie, Eugène Gigout, Toccata in B minor, Katarina Kyrka, Stockholm, Guild Music GMCD 7802
Maurice Duruflé, The Organ Music, Louis Vierne, Trois Improvisations, Coventry Cathedral, Guild Music GMCD 7804. Reissue 2019
César Franck, Organ Works, Cathedral and Abbey Church of St. Alban, (2019) Guild Music GMCD 7816

External links
 http://www.impulse-music.co.uk/davidmpatrick.htm

1947 births
Living people
English organists
British male organists
21st-century organists
21st-century British male musicians